Carbohydrate sulfotransferase 5 is an enzyme that in humans is encoded by the CHST5 gene.

References

External links

Further reading